The Emergence of Modern Turkey is a 1961 book written by historian Bernard Lewis, an expert in the history of Middle East and Islam.

The book covers the history of modern Turkey, from the decline and collapse of the Ottoman Empire up to the present days.

Contents

Chapter I Introduction: the Sources of Turkish Civilization
Part I The Stages of Emergence  
Chapter II The Decline of the Ottoman Empire
Chapter III The Impact of the West
Chapter IV The Ottoman Reform
Chapter V The Seeds of Revolution
Chapter VI Despotism and Enlightenment
Chapter VII Union and Progress
Chapter VIII The Kemalist Republic
Chapter IX The Republic after Kemal
Part II Aspects of Change  
Chapter X Community and Nation
Chapter XI State and Government
Chapter XII Religion and Culture
Chapter XIII Elite and Class
Chapter XIV Conclusions: The Turkish Revolution 
Select Bibliography
Maps

Notes

1961 non-fiction books
Political books
Books about the Ottoman Empire
History of the Republic of Turkey
Books by Bernard Lewis